Wulfstan v Thomas was an early court case in English law. Bishop Wulstan, later Saint Wulfstan, was appealing to the new king against the taking of estates that had belonged to the Cathedral at Worcester.

Background
Prior to the Norman Conquest a former bishop, Ealdred, had taken in personum (as private property) various estates that had belonged to the diocese of Worcester, when he left to become the Bishop at York.  Following the death of Ealdred these estates were now held by the Bishopric of York.

In this case the new Bishop of Worcester was seeking from William the Conqueror, the new Norman king, that Thomas the Bishop of York restore the lands that had belonged to Worcester.

This was a very brave move as Thomas the new bishop at York was a favourite of William and trusted disciple of William's brother Odo of Bayeux.

Result
The Plaint was successful.

The court cases can be viewed as a part of a large collection of pleadings against a process of Normanization that within a decade saw 64% of land in England consolidated into the hands of just 150 individuals, and many of the nobility deprived of their estates.

See also 
 Trial of Penenden Heath (1071)
 Odo of Bayeux v Lanfranc (1071)

References

History of Worcester, England
Medieval English law
Norman conquest of England
1070
11th century in law
Trials in England
Legal history of England
Court of King's Bench (England) cases
English property case law